ECWA may refer to:
Evangelical Church Winning All, Church with over 10 million in total attendance worldwide
East Coast Wrestling Association, an American professional wrestling promotion